Ikonge is a settlement in Kenya's Nyanza Province.

As of 2019, it has a close to 10, 000 population and is in the process of bringing significant social and economical reforms.

References 

Populated places in Nyanza Province